COVID-19 on ships refers to:

 COVID-19 pandemic on cruise ships
 COVID-19 pandemic on naval ships
 Hospital ships designated for the 2019–20 coronavirus pandemic